Dale S. Wright is Emeritus Professor of Religious Studies at Occidental College in Los Angeles. He is author of numerous books on Zen Buddhism. He and Steven Heine co-edited a series of books including The Koan: Text and Context in Zen Buddhism, The Zen Canon: Textual Foundations of Zen Buddhism, Zen Classics: Formative Texts in the History of Zen Buddhism, and Zen Ritual: Studies of Zen Buddhist Theory in Practice.

References

Living people
Year of birth missing (living people)
Occidental College faculty
American theologians